Acacia gnidium is a shrub belonging to the genus Acacia and the subgenus Phyllodineae that is native to parts of north eastern Australia.

The shrub is found in Central Queensland from around Kroombit Tops National Park in the south east to around Springsure in the south west and up to around the White Mountains in the north where it is found on rugged rocky sandstone country as a part of scrub or Eucalyptus woodland communities.

See also
 List of Acacia' species

References

gnidium
Flora of Queensland
Plants described in 1864
Taxa named by George Bentham